Clathurella eversoni is a species of sea snail, a marine gastropod mollusk in the family Clathurellidae.

Distribution
This species occurs in the Western Atlantic Ocean and in the Caribbean Sea.

References

eversoni